Jesus freak is a term arising from the late 1960s and early 1970s counterculture and is frequently used as a pejorative for those involved in the Jesus movement. As Tom Wolfe illustrates in The Electric Kool-Aid Acid Test, the term "freak" with a preceding qualifier was a strictly neutral term and described any counterculture member with a specific interest in a given subject; hence "acid freak" and "Jesus freak". The term "freak" was in common-enough currency that Hunter S. Thompson's failed bid for sheriff of Pitkin County, Colorado, was as a member of the "Freak Power" party. However, many later members of the movement, those misunderstanding the countercultural roots, believed the term to be negative, and co-opted and embraced the term, and its usage broadened to describe a Christian subculture throughout the hippie and back-to-the-land movements that focused on universal love and pacifism, and relished the radical nature of Jesus' message. Jesus freaks often carried and distributed copies of the Good News for Modern Man, a 1966 translation of the New Testament written in modern English. In Australia, and other countries, the term "Jesus freak", along with "Bible basher", is still used in a derogatory manner. In Germany, there is a Christian youth culture, also called Jesus Freaks International, that claims to have its roots in the U.S. movement.

See also 

 Jesus Freaks International
 Jesus movement
 Jesus music

References

Further reading 
 Di Sabatino, David. The Jesus People Movement: An Annotated Bibliography and General Resource (Westport, CT: Greenwood Press, 1999). Jesus People Movement
 
 
 
 
 Call, Keith. "Jesus Freaks ." Special Collections. 15 January 2009.
 Geisler, Gertude. Ramey, B., Jessie. "Jesus Freaks." 2004.
 
 Young, Shawn David. "From Hippies to Jesus Freaks: Christian Radicalism in Chicago’s Inner-City." Journal of Religion and Popular Culture. Vol 22(2) Summer 2010.
 Young, Shawn David (2015). Gray Sabbath: Jesus People USA, the Evangelical Left, and the Evolution of Christian Rock. Columbia University Press. 

Jesus movement

Religious slurs for people
1960s
1970s
Counterculture
English phrases
de:Jesus Freaks